Edmond Auger (1530 – 19 January 1591) was a French Jesuit priest.

Life

Born near Troyes, he entered the Society of Jesus while St. Ignatius was still living, and was regarded as one of the most eloquent men of his time. Mathew calls him the "Chrysostom of France". Wherever he went, throngs flocked to hear him, and the heretics themselves were always eager to be present, captivated as they were by the charm of his wisdom and the delicacy of his courtesy in their regard. His entrance into France as a priest was in the city of Valence, where the bishop had just apostatized, and the Calvinists were then in possession. The efforts of Auger to address the people were followed by his being seized and sentenced to be burned to death. While standing on the pyre, he harangued the multitude, and so won their good will they asked for his deliverance. Pierre Viret, especially, the chief orator of the Calvinists, wanted to have a public discussion with him to convert him. Auger was consequently sent to prison for the night, but the Catholics rescued him before the conference took place.

Later he was in Lyons, during a pestilence, devoting himself to the plague-stricken. When the pest had ceased, in consequence of a vow he made, the authorities, in gratitude, established a college of the Society to which Auger asked much to their astonishment, that the children of the Calvinists might be admitted. His whole life was one of constant activity, preaching and administering the responsible offices of Provincial, Rector etc., that were entrusted to him.

He was finally made confessor of king Henry III, the first Jesuit to have that troublesome charge put upon him. The difficulty of his position was increased by the fact that the League was just then being formed by the Catholic succession. Its principles and methods were sought to trench on the royal prerogative; but Sixtus V was in favour of it. Several Jesuits, notably the Provincial, Mathieu, who was deposed by Acquaviva, were its stanch upholders. Auger's position was intolerable. Loyal to the king, he was detested by the leaguers who at Lyons, the city that he had saved, threatened to throw him into the Rhone. They compromised by expelling him from the city. The general commanded him to relinquish the post of confessor, but the King secured the pope's order for him to stay. Finally Auger prevailed on the monarch to release him, he withdrew to Como in Italy, where he died. Shortly afterwards Henry was assassinated.

Works
Like Canisius in Germany, Auger published a Catechism for France. It appeared at first in Latin, and later he published it in Greek. He wrote a work on the Blessed Eucharist, instructions for soldiers, translations, some literary compositions, and also drew up the statutes for congregations, especially one in which the king was interested, called the Congregation of Penitents. There is a letter by him called "Spiritual Sugar", though he did not give it that title. He had written an address to the people of Toulouse to console them in the distress brought on by the calamities of the authorities of the civil war. It so took the popular fancy that authorities of the city published it under this curious caption.

References

External links
Catholic Encyclopedia Article

1530 births
1591 deaths
16th-century French Jesuits